

Medalists

Standings

Men's Competition

Women's Competition

References
Complete 1993 Mediterranean Games Standings

Sports at the 1993 Mediterranean Games
Volleyball at the Mediterranean Games
1993 in volleyball